Pecan Gap is a city in Delta and Fannin counties within the U.S. state of Texas. It is sometimes informally referred to as "The Gap" by area residents. The population was 178 at the time of the 2020 census. It is named for the gap between two pecan trees, but unfortunately one of the two pecan trees was destroyed by a tornado in 1963.

History

The first inhabitants of the area that is now Pecan Gap were the Caddo people, who settled large portions of eastern Texas as early as 800 CE. The Caddo were highly advanced, living in large wooden structures, and were skilled farmers. The first European to visit the area was French explorer François Hervey, around 1750. A few decades afterwards, European disease and attacks from neighboring tribes as well as attacks from European settlers forced the Caddo out of the area around Pecan Gap. Around 1820, Delaware, Quapaw, and Seminole tribes began settling in the area. In 1836, the Republic of Texas officially recognized the region around Pecan Gap as part of Red River County. In 1840, Lamar County was formed, which absorbed much of the area just south of Pecan Gap. However, just six years later, the region was designated as part of the newly formed Hopkins County. In 1870 Delta County was created. As Pecan Gap grew it expanded west into Fannin County.

Geography

Pecan Gap is one of just two incorporated communities in Delta County. The city is the second largest in the county, population-wise, behind Cooper.

Pecan Gap, as well as most of Delta County, is located in the Texas blackland prairies region, a flat, tallgrass prairie ecosystem that covers a large portion of north-central Texas. The area's geology consists mainly of deep clay, or clay mixed with a dark-colored loam. However, the county is also known to have high-quality topsoil, ideal for crop growing. A specific layer of the soil in the region is known as Pecan Gap Chalk, named for the city when it was discovered nearby in 1918. The layer is a blue-gray, sandy chalk substance, which is fossil-rich and is located in much of the Pecan Gap vicinity.

Under the Köppen climate classification, Pecan Gap is located in zone Cfa, which experiences warm, wet summers and a humid subtropical climate. Temperatures in Pecan Gap are generally high, with the average  in January being  and in July being . August is the driest month for the city, when it receives an average of just  of rain.

Demographics

According to the 2020 United States census, there were 178 people, 94 households, and 79 families residing in the city. At the 2000 census, 214 people, 103 households, and 57 families resided in the city. The population density was 343.6 people per square mile (133.3/km). There were 123 housing units  averaged 197.5 per square mile (76.6/km). The racial makeup of the city was 88.32% White, 7.94% African American, 0.47% Asian, 2.80% from other races, and 0.47% from two or more races. Hispanics or Latinos of any race were 6.54% of the population.

Of the 103 households, 20.4% had children under the age of 18 living with them, 40.8% were married couples living together, 12.6% had a female householder with no husband present, and 43.7% were not families. About 40.8% of all households were made up of individuals, and 17.5% had someone living alone who was 65 years of age or older. The average household size was 2.08 and the average family size was 2.78.

In the city, the population was distributed as  19.6% under the age of 18, 6.5% from 18 to 24, 31.8% from 25 to 44, 22.9% from 45 to 64, and 19.2% who were 65 years of age or older. The median age was 41 years. For every 100 females, there were 98.1 males. For every 100 females age 18 and over, there were 97.7 males.

Males had a median income of $38,000 versus $22,000 for females. The per capita income for the city was $16,704. About 16.7% of families and 19.0% of the population were below the poverty line, including 18.4% of those under the age of eighteen and 25.0% of those sixty five or over.

Pecan Festival

Held annually on the second Saturday of October, a local event known as the Pecan Festival (or simply "Pecan Fest") takes place. It is organized by the Pecan Gap Ladies Club and features various attractions such as a parade, pet show, lawnmower races, food and drinks, and a gift shop open only during the event.

Education
Pecan Gap is served by the Fannindel Independent School District.

References

Cities in Delta County, Texas
Cities in Fannin County, Texas
Cities in Texas
Dallas–Fort Worth metroplex